Grevillea refracta, commonly known as silver-leaf grevillea, is a species of plant in the protea family and is native to northern Australia. It is a tree or shrub usually with pinnatipartite leaves and red and yellow flowers arranged on a branched, downcurved raceme.

Description
The lower surface of the leaves is hairy.

Taxonomy
Grevillea refracta was first formally described in 1810 by the botanist Robert Brown in Transactions of the Linnean Society of London. The specific epithet (refracta) means "bent downwards".

In 1994, Peter Olde and Neil Marriott described two subspecies of G. refracta and the names are accepted by the Australian Plant Census:

Distribution and habitat
Subspecies glandulifera grows in woodland and savanna and is found in the Ord River catchment in Western Australia, extending just into the far west of the Northern Territory. Subspecies refracta grows in woodland, savanna and Triodia communities and is widespread in Western Australia, the Northern Territory and north-western Queensland, including on nearby islands, north of about latitude 21°S.

References

refracta
Eudicots of Western Australia
Flora of the Northern Territory
Flora of Queensland
Proteales of Australia
Plants described in 1810
Taxa named by Robert Brown (botanist, born 1773)